The Baraboo River  is a tributary of the Wisconsin River, about 70 mi (115 km) long, in south-central Wisconsin in the United States.  Via the Wisconsin River, it is part of the watershed of the Mississippi River.

The Baraboo River was probably named after a French trader in the area, Francois Barbeau, although it may also be a corruption of a French word or phrase.

Course
The Baraboo River rises in southeastern Monroe County and flows generally southeastwardly through Juneau, Sauk and Columbia Counties, past Kendall, Elroy, Union Center, Wonewoc, La Valle, Reedsburg, Rock Springs, North Freedom, West Baraboo and Baraboo.  It flows into the Wisconsin River from the west, about 3 mi (5 km) south of Portage.

In its upper course above Elroy, the river is paralleled by the Elroy-Sparta Bike Trail.

Tributaries
At Union Center, the river collects the West Branch Baraboo River, which rises in eastern Vernon County and flows generally eastwardly past Hillsboro.
Just downstream of La Valle, the river collects the Little Baraboo River, which rises in eastern Vernon County and flows generally eastwardly past Ironton.  Along its course the Little Baraboo River briefly enters Richland County.

See also
List of Wisconsin rivers

References

 Columbia Gazetteer of North America entry
 DeLorme (1992).  Wisconsin Atlas & Gazetteer.  Freeport, Maine: DeLorme.  .

External links

Rivers of Wisconsin
Rivers of Columbia County, Wisconsin
Rivers of Juneau County, Wisconsin
Rivers of Monroe County, Wisconsin
Rivers of Richland County, Wisconsin
Rivers of Vernon County, Wisconsin